Robert Wild (Wylde) (1615–1679) was an English clergyman and poet, ejected from his living in 1662. Despite presbyterian views, Wild was a royalist in politics. John Dryden called him 'the Wither of the city.' He wrote extensively, often anonymously and controversially.

Life
Wild was the son of Robert Wild, a shoemaker of St. Ives, Huntingdonshire. After a private school education at St. Ives, he was admitted as a sizar to St. John's College, Cambridge, on 26 January 1632, and was made a scholar in 1634. He graduated as a B.A. at the beginning of 1636, an M.A. in 1639, and B.D. of Oxford on 1 November 1642. He was made a D.D. per litteras regias on 9 November 1660.

As a young man, Wild held strong Puritan views, and was inducted into the living of Aynhoe, Northamptonshire, on 22 July 1646 by order of the House of Commons. Wild's reputation for irregular wit gave his friend Richard Baxter so much uneasiness that he visited Aynhoe, intending to rebuke him. However, after having sat in the corner of the church, and listened to his sermon, he changed his mind and instead asked Wilde to rebuke him sharply, for having listened to the reports!

Wild was ejected by the Act of Uniformity 1662. He lived at Aynhoe a year or two after 1662, supported amongst others by Sir John Baber, Charles II's physician, to whom, for a timely gift of ten crowns, Wild addressed The Grateful Nonconformist (1665). Later Wild was living at Oundle. He was indicted in July 1669 at Warwick and Coventry assizes for keeping a conventicle.

By his wife, Joyce, Wild had at least two sons, both of whom were reportedly conforming ministers. He died at Oundle of a fit of apoplexy, and was buried there on 30 July 1679.

Works
His best-known poem is Iter Boreale. Attempting Something upon the Successful and Matchless March of the Lord General George Monk from Scotland to London. By a Rural Pen. It was printed on 23 April (London, 1660), and at once became popular, as a tribute to General George Monck. An edition Poems by Robert Wild was published by John Hunt in 1870.

Notes

Bibliography
Hunt, John. Poems by Robert Wilde,  with a historical and biographical preface and notes (Strahan, 1870).

1615 births
1679 deaths
17th-century English Anglican priests
People from St Ives, Cambridgeshire
English male poets
People from Aynho